Sphodromantis biocellata is a species of praying mantis found in Angola, Cameroon, and Central African Republic.

See also
African mantis
List of mantis genera and species

References

biocellata
Mantodea of Africa
Insects described in 1906